Laia Aleixandri López (born 25 August 2000) is a Spanish professional footballer who plays as defender for FA Women's Super League club Manchester City and the Spain women's national team.

In January 2020, she was named by UEFA as one of the 10 most promising young players in Europe.

International career
Aleixandri represented Spain at the 2016 FIFA U-17 Women's World Cup and 2018 FIFA U-20 Women's World Cup. She made her senior debut on 17 May 2019 in a friendly against Cameroon. She scored her first international goal in that match. In 2023, she was part of the 15 players that withdrawn themselves from the national team in a rift with the national team coach Jorge Vilda.

Career Statistics

Club

International 

Scores and results list Spain's goal tally first, score column indicates score after each Aleixandri goal.

References

2000 births
Living people
People from Santa Coloma de Gramenet
Sportspeople from the Province of Barcelona
Sportswomen from Catalonia
Footballers from Catalonia
Spanish women's footballers
Women's association football defenders
FC Barcelona Femení B players
Atlético Madrid Femenino players
Primera División (women) players
Spain women's youth international footballers
Spain women's international footballers
UEFA Women's Euro 2022 players
Spanish expatriate women's footballers
Expatriate sportspeople in England
21st-century Spanish women